LifeLock Inc.  is  American identity theft software, sold by Tempe, Arizona-based company Gen Digital Inc.. LifeLock's system monitors for identity theft, the use of personal information, and credit score changes.

LifeLock was acquired by computer security company Symantec in 2017 for $2.3 billion. After Symantec sold its enterprise division to Broadcom, the company was renamed from Symantec to NortonLifeLock in November 2019, and Gen Digital Inc. in 2022. In the same year, the company began to offer versions of its Norton 360 subscription service with LifeLock included.

History
LifeLock was co-founded in 2005 by Robert J. Maynard and Todd Davis.

Maynard began his career by founding the Internet Service Provider (ISP) Internet America in the late 1990s. Former LifeLock CEO Davis worked for Dell before founding Marketing Champions.

Maynard resigned from LifeLock in June 2007 after claims that he was a victim of identity theft came under scrutiny. Davis publicly posted his Social Security number as part of a 2007 ad campaign to promote the company's identity theft protection services. However, Davis was a victim of 13 cases of identity theft between 2007 and 2008. Regarding the campaign, Davis said, "We were trying to make the point that ... all it takes is one data breach. The point of that campaign was to take proactive steps to protect your identity."

In December 2008, LifeLock entered into an agreement with TransUnion, one of the three main credit bureaus, to automate the process of alerting customers of potential unauthorized access via their credit reports.

As part of a 2009 settlement with Experian related to false fraud alerts allegations, LifeLock set up a service that does not rely on fraud alerts.

In March 2012, LifeLock acquired ID Analytics, which operates independently as a wholly owned subsidiary Following LifeLock's initial public offering (IPO) announcement in August 2012, Hilary Schneider joined the company as president.

In December 2013, LifeLock acquired Lemon Wallet, a digital wallet platform, for $42.6 million.

In 2015, the FTC obtained a $100 million monetary penalty against LifeLock with $68 million held for class-action refunds to customers in relation to false advertising and failed service delivery allegations.

In January 2016, the company announced that Hilary Schneider would replace Todd Davis as CEO.

LifeLock was acquired by Symantec for $2.3 billion on February 9, 2017. The company subsequently began to offer its Norton subscription services with LifeLock included.

Funding
The company started with $2 million in seed funding with another $5 million in its Series A funding in 2006 from Bessemer Ventures.

LifeLock raised $6 million in its series B funding from Kleiner Perkins Caufield & Byers in April 2007. The following January, its Series C Funding raised $25 million, led by Goldman Sachs Group, Inc. In August 2009, a series D funding round raised $40 million for the company. In March 2013, LifeLock raised $100 million in new equity funding from Bessemer Ventures Partners, Goldman, Sachs & Co., Kleiner Perkins Caufield & Byers, Symantec Corporation, and River Street Management. The funds were used towards the acquisition of ID Analytics, an identity theft risk prediction technology.

LifeLock announced plans to take its identity theft protection business public and filed for an IPO worth up to $175 million on August 28, 2012. The company was listed on the New York Stock Exchange starting October 3, 2012, trading under the symbol LOCK. LifeLock filed a form with the Securities and Exchange Commission to voluntarily deregister its common stock in 2017 after its acquisition by Symantec for $2.3 billion. 

Following Symantec's name change in November 2019, Symantec's stock symbol became NLOK.

Controversies
Robert J. Maynard, Jr., a co-founder of the company, resigned in June 2007 following a controversial story published in Phoenix New Times about his past. The story involved bankruptcy, FTC investigation, and identity theft.

LifeLock was fined $12 million by the Federal Trade Commission in March 2010 for deceptive advertising. The FTC called the company's prior marketing claims misleading to consumers by claiming to be a 100% guarantee against all forms of identity theft.

In 2015, the FTC found LifeLock to be in contempt of the 2010 agreement, charging that they "failed to establish and maintain a comprehensive information security program", and "falsely advertised that it protected consumers' sensitive data". The FTC obtained a $100 million monetary penalty against LifeLock to settle the contempt charge. Of that fine, $68 million was held for class-action refunds to LifeLock customers.

2022 data breach 
In December 2022, LifeLock servers suffered an attack using credential stuffing, and over 6,000 user accounts had their details disclosed, including names, addresses and phone number.  The method of attack was to use credentials from previous unrelated breaches.  This resulted in a large number of failed login attempts on 16 December 2022. Notification of the breach was sent in January 2023.

See also
FICO
Todd Davis
Robert Maynard Jr.

References

External links

Identity theft
2012 initial public offerings
Companies formerly listed on the New York Stock Exchange
Gen Digital acquisitions
Norton (software)
2017 mergers and acquisitions
Security software